Quaker Square was a shopping and dining complex located in downtown Akron, Ohio which is now used by the University of Akron.  Quaker Square was the original Quaker Oats factory; the complex consists of the former mill, factory, and silos. The buildings were bought in the early 1970s by developers who sought to create a unique, useful home for shops and restaurants.  The buildings were bought by the University of Akron in 2007.  The hotel has been converted to a residence hall.  The retail space consisted of dozens of small shops and restaurants, and there were large areas of historic exhibits on such areas as the local Quaker industry and history of radio in Akron, while offices were on the floors above.  Quaker Square was open to the general public until September 18, 2015. The hotel no longer accepts reservations as the former hotel rooms and the entire complex is operated exclusively for student and university use. However, ballrooms are still available for catered events and conferences.

History
The Quaker Oats company was formed by the merger of several businesses, one was the Akron-based German Mills American Oatmeal Company founded by Ferdinand Schumacher.  Schumacher's facility, first built in 1872, was destroyed by fire in 1886, then was rebuilt at the same location.  Those buildings formed the basis of the Quaker Oats Cereal Factory. The complex consisted of cereal production facilities, warehouses, and rail-siding sheds.  Quaker Oats built 36 grain silos on the site in 1932. Each silo was 120 feet tall and 24 feet in diameter, and together they housed 1.5 million bushels of grain.

The complex is now the only remaining visual reminder of what was once Akron's largest single employer. Quaker Oats terminated production in Akron in 1970. The entire complex was listed in the National Register of Historic Places in 1972.

Mall
The facility was repurposed in March 1973, and reopened 1 April 1975 with four shops and an ice cream parlor.

The silos were converted into a Hilton Hotel which opened in 1980. Later it became a Crowne Plaza hotel. The hotel is built into the suite of silos and is famed for its 196 completely round rooms. (Source: "Quaker Chronicle" promotional sheet available at the hotel.)

The Trackside Grille & Ice Cream Parlor, a restaurant themed with railroads which run parallel to the building, also provided a narrative of Akron's history. The Trackside Dining Room was constructed with the beams and columns of the factory building. (Source: "Quaker Chronicle" promotional sheet available at the hotel.)

The Quaker Square General Store offered oatmeal cookies, pie-baking classes for children, and "nostalgic" candy. (Source: "Quaker Chronicle" promotional sheet available at the hotel.)

Purchase by University of Akron
In mid-June 2007 the University of Akron bought the complex for $22,679,000 with plans to convert it into student housing and office space. The university planned to house more than 400 students in the converted hotel starting with the 2008 spring semester. In January 2008, the university began to use the upper floors of the hotel as a residence hall.

Under contract with UA, RDA Management of Fairlawn operated 95 hotel rooms on the four bottom floors of the silos for the following two years. The university agreed to keep those rooms available to the public for that period to give the city an opportunity to secure more hotel space for downtown visitors and tourists. On June 30, 2013 the hotel was closed and converted entirely into student housing. The last of the shops at Quaker Square, as well as Trackside, closed in 2016. The only remaining store was a Zee's store which is a convenience store for students to buy groceries and snacks. As of August 2018, Zee's moved to the lobby of UA's Quaker Hall, leaving the retail portion empty. That side of the complex continues to house offices on the second, third, and fourth floors.

Gallery

Former Amtrak station

Akron station, located at Quaker Square, was served by Amtrak passenger trains during the 1990s and 2000s.

The former Akron Union Station, slightly to the south, was closed in 1971 when Amtrak did not include a Washington-Chicago train on the Baltimore and Ohio Railroad (B&O) as part of its initial route structure. On November 10, 1990, the Broadway Limited was rerouted from the ex-Pennsylvania Railroad Fort Wayne Line to the ex-B&O. Union Station had been reused by the University of Akron; Amtrak used part of the former platform and constructed a modular station building at Quaker Square.

The New York-Chicago Broadway Limited was replaced with the New York-Pittsburgh Three Rivers on September 10, 1995, ending service to Akron. The Three Rivers was extended to Chicago through Akron on November 10, 1996; however, Amtrak and the city disagreed over who would pay for necessary repairs to the station. Akron station reopened on August 10, 1998 – the last of several ex-Broadway stops to be restored. The Three Rivers was cut back to Pittsburgh as the Pennsylvanian on March 7, 2005, ending service to Akron again.

References

External links

 Quaker Square, about.com

Agricultural buildings and structures on the National Register of Historic Places in Ohio
Agricultural buildings and structures on the National Register of Historic Places
Buildings and structures in Akron, Ohio
Historic American Engineering Record in Ohio
Hotels in Ohio
National Register of Historic Places in Summit County, Ohio
Quaker Oats Company
University and college dormitories in the United States
University of Akron
Former railway stations in Ohio
Former Amtrak stations in Ohio
Railway stations in the United States opened in 1990
Railway stations in the United States opened in 1998
Railway stations closed in 1995
Railway stations closed in 2005